Sophie Ecclestone (born 6 May 1999) is an English cricketer who plays for Lancashire, North West Thunder, Manchester Originals, Sydney Sixers, UP Warriorz and England. In December 2018, the International Cricket Council (ICC) named her the Emerging Player of the Year. At the end of the ICC Women's T20 World Cup in March 2020, she became the world's number one bowler in Women's Twenty20 International (WT20I) cricket. In July 2021, Ecclestone was named the ICC Women's Player of the Month for June 2021.

Early life 
Ecclestone was born in Chester, Cheshire, and raised in Helsby, a village in the same county. From when she was a young child, she, her older brother, James, and her father, Paul, played cricket or football outside their home, on a daily basis. She also displayed proficiency at cricket. 

Ecclestone considers that her brother James, who taught her how to play both football and cricket, has been the biggest influence on her career. She received her formal cricketing education at Alvanley Cricket Club in Helsby, where her father was the junior coordinator, and she was the only girl on the club's pathway. She joined the club's junior section at seven years of age, and entered the Cheshire U13s pathway just two years later. When Ecclestone made her debut for the Alvanley boys' first team, James was one of her teammates.

According to former member of the Cheshire men's team and Alvanley's then left-arm spinner, Robin Fisher, who helped Ecclestone to discover the art of finger spinning, she was so naturally talented that she did not need much coaching. Even then, some of the Alvanley boys speculated that she would play for England when she was older, but at that time she was just playing cricket for fun. By 2022, the club had made her a life member.

Ecclestone attended Helsby High School. On one occasion, she embarrassed her new school headmaster, after he allowed her to participate in an informal cricket match during the after school club. In 2020, she told BBC Sport:

In 2013 she started playing for the Cheshire women's county team. She was then spotted by Lancashire, for which she signed and made her top-level domestic debut in 2015 at the age of 16.

Career

Domestic 
In April 2022, she was bought by the Manchester Originals for the 2022 season of The Hundred.

International 
Ecclestone was then fast-tracked into England's Academy squad. In 2016, still aged 16, she was selected for the England Academy winter squad, and went on her first tour abroad, to Sri Lanka with the Academy. During that tour, and despite suffering from homesickness, she took 16 wickets for the Academy in a tri-series against Australia A and Sri Lanka A, including four wickets in a match against the latter team in Panagoda.

On 3 July 2016, she made her WT20I debut at the age of 17, during Pakistan's tour of England. During that match, she had the good fortune to take her first wicket with a full toss. In September 2016 she was named in the England women's One Day International squad for their tour to the West Indies the following month.

As the 2017 Women's Cricket World Cup approached, Ecclestone was in contention for selection to play for England, the ultimate winner of the tournament. However, she was still 17 years old, and had another round of exams to go before finishing school. Ecclestone, her parents and England's then coach Mark Robinson therefore decided that she would not play for England that summer.

 Since passing those exams, Ecclestone has been a fixture in the England team. On 9 November 2017, she made her Test debut for England women against Australia women in the Women's Ashes.

In October 2018, she was named in England's squad for the 2018 ICC Women's World Twenty20 tournament in the West Indies. Ahead of the tournament, she was named as one of the players to watch.

In February 2019, she was awarded a full central contract by the England and Wales Cricket Board (ECB) for 2019. In June 2019, the ECB named her in England's squad for their opening match against Australia to contest the Women's Ashes.

In January 2020, she was named in England's squad for the 2020 ICC Women's T20 World Cup in Australia. On 1 March 2020, in England's final group match of the tournament, Ecclestone took her 50th wicket in WT20Is, and her 100th wicket in international cricket. She became the youngest woman to take 50 wickets in WT20I cricket, which she achieved in 34 matches. With eight tournament wickets at an average of 6.12 and an economy rate of just 3.23, she also emerged from the tournament as the world's number one WT20I bowler.

Ecclestone was the first England bowler to hold that distinction since Anya Shrubsole in 2016, and the first England spinner to do so since Danielle Hazell in 2015. She told The Cricketer in June 2020 that when the news was released, it was both overwhelming and the fulfilment of a dream she had had for several years.

On 18 June 2020, Ecclestone was named in a squad of 24 players to begin training ahead of international women's fixtures starting in England following the COVID-19 pandemic. In February 2021, during England's tour of New Zealand, Ecclestone took her 100th international wicket. In June 2021, Ecclestone was named as in England's Test squad for their one-off match against India.

In December 2021, Ecclestone was named in England's squad for their tour to Australia to contest the Women's Ashes. In February 2022, she was named in England's team for the 2022 Women's Cricket World Cup in New Zealand. During the tournament, she took a total of 21 wickets, just two short of Lyn Fullston's all-time record for ODI World Cup tournaments; her scalps included three back-to-back three-wicket hauls. On 31 March 2022, in the semi-final match of the World Cup against South Africa, Ecclestone took her first five-wicket haul in WODIs, with 6/36.

In July 2022, she was named in England's team for the cricket tournament at the 2022 Commonwealth Games in Birmingham, England.

Personal life
Ecclestone has a fiancé, Craig, and an ambition to become a pilot, as well as a World Cup winner. However, she told BBC Sport in 2020 that Craig had been "not thrilled" at the prospect of accompanying her on a flying lesson flight her parents had given her for her twenty-first birthday.

Ecclestone supports Everton Football Club.

References

External links

1999 births
Living people
Sportspeople from Chester
English women cricketers
England women Test cricketers
England women Twenty20 International cricketers
England women One Day International cricketers
Cheshire women cricketers
Lancashire women cricketers
Lancashire Thunder cricketers
North West Thunder cricketers
Manchester Originals cricketers
IPL Trailblazers cricketers
IPL Supernovas cricketers
UP Warriorz cricketers
Sydney Sixers (WBBL) cricketers
Cricketers at the 2022 Commonwealth Games
Commonwealth Games competitors for England